Pedro Chagas Freitas (born 25 September 1979 in Azurém, Guimarães, is a writer, journalist, writing teacher and public speaker from Portugal.

He has more than 15 books published  and received a "Young Creators" award from the National Cultural Centre in Portugal.

He is the creator of a National Championship of Creative Writing.

He developed the first book written in Facebook and wrote live a romance for 24 consecutive hours in a shopping center.

Chagas Freitas also works also as professional public speaker in the fields of leadership, self-confidence, peak performance and life management. In June 2011 he led a writing seminar at the Escola Profissional de Braga

References

External links 
Personal Blog

1979 births
Living people
Portuguese male writers
People from Guimarães